= Foltz, West Virginia =

Extinct town in West Virginia, U.S.

Coordinates: 39°29′57″N 77°51′41″W

Foltz is an extinct town in Berkeley County, in the U.S. state of West Virginia.

== History ==
A post office called Foltz was established in 1890, and remained in operation until 1907. Reverend C. W. Foltz, an early postmaster, gave the community his family name.
